Crown of Ancient Glory is an adventure module for the Dungeons & Dragons fantasy role-playing game. It was published by TSR in 1987, and designed by Stephen Bourne. Its cover art is by Keith Parkinson, with interior art by Chris Miller and cartography by Dave S. LaForce. The module's associated code is X13 and its TSR product code is TSR 9218. This module was developed and intended for use with the Dungeons & Dragons Expert Set and Companion Set rules.

Plot summary
In Crown of Ancient Glory, the player characters must find the heir to the kingdom of Vestland and retrieve the magical Sonora Crown to unite the country before the Ethengar Khanate invades. The module includes plans for a longship.

The player characters assist the kingdom of Vestland, whose High King has recently died. They must also recover the missing holy Sonora Crown, which is also a powerful artifact. The heir to the kingdom was lost at birth, and the players must determine the identity and location of the lawful heir of Vestland. The characters must deal with traitors and spies from within, and invaders from the forces of the Ethengar Khanate, massing on the borders to take advantage of Vestland's plight.

Publication history
X13 Crown of Ancient Glory was written by Stephen Bourne, with a cover by Keith Parkinson and interior illustrations by Chris Miller, and was published by TSR in 1987 as a 64-page booklet with an outer folder.

Reception

References

Dungeons & Dragons modules
Mystara
Role-playing game supplements introduced in 1987